The 1987–88 North Carolina A&T Aggies men's basketball team represented North Carolina Agricultural and Technical State University during the 1987–88 NCAA Division I men's basketball season. The Aggies, led by 9th-year head coach Don Corbett, played their home games at the Corbett Sports Center as members of the Mid-Eastern Athletic Conference. They finished the season 26–3, 16–0 in MEAC play to finish in first place by 5 games. They were champions of the MEAC tournament, winning the championship game over Florida A&M, to earn an automatic bid to the 1988 NCAA tournament – the school's 7th straight appearance in the NCAA Tournament – where they were defeated by No. 3 seed Syracuse, 69–55, in the opening round.

Roster

Schedule and results

|-
!colspan=9 style=| Regular season

|-
!colspan=9 style=| 1988 MEAC tournament

|-
!colspan=9 style=|1988 NCAA tournament

Awards and honors
Claude Williams – MEAC Player of the Year

References

North Carolina A&T Aggies men's basketball seasons
North Carolina
North Carolina AandT
North Carolina AandT Aggies men's basketball
North Carolina AandT Aggies men's basketball